Ibrahim Diallo (born 12 August 1996) is a Malian footballer who played as a central defender.

Club career
An Aspire Academy youth graduate, Sikasso-born Diallo joined K.A.S. Eupen in July 2014. He made his senior debut on 3 September of that year, starting in a 3–1 home win against SC Eendracht Aalst for the Belgian Second Division.

On 30 January 2015, having featured regularly during the first part of the season, Diallo signed with Valencia CF and was assigned to its reserve team, in Segunda División B. He made his first-team debut on 2 December, starting in a 3–1 away victory over Barakaldo CF in the round of 32 of the Copa del Rey.

On 20 July 2016, Diallo rejoined Eupen. His first game in top-flight football took place ten days later, when he played the entire 0–3 away loss to S.V. Zulte Waregem for the Belgian First Division A. After suffering a knee injury in 2017 he remained under contract at Eupen but never played again, officially retiring in July 2020.

International career
Diallo represented Mali at the 2011 African Youth Championship.

References

External links

1996 births
Living people
People from Sikasso
Malian footballers
Association football defenders
Aspire Academy (Senegal) players
Belgian Pro League players
Challenger Pro League players
K.A.S. Eupen players
Segunda División B players
Valencia CF Mestalla footballers
Valencia CF players
Mali under-20 international footballers
Malian expatriate footballers
Expatriate footballers in Belgium
Expatriate footballers in Spain
Malian expatriate sportspeople in Belgium
Malian expatriate sportspeople in Spain
21st-century Malian people